Richard Brown is an American politician in the Missouri House of Representatives, elected in November 2016 to represent District 27, and is a member of the Democratic Party (United States). Since 2019, he serves as the Assistant Minority Floor Leader of the Missouri House of Representatives.

Committee assignments 
 Joint Committee on Public Employee Retirement, Missouri State Legislature
 Pensions Committee, Missouri House of Representatives, Ranking Minority Member
 Professional Registration and Licensing Committee, Missouri House of Representatives, Ranking Minority Member
 Ethics, Vice Chair
Source:

Electoral history

References

University of Central Missouri alumni
Democratic Party members of the Missouri House of Representatives
Living people
21st-century American politicians
Year of birth missing (living people)